Super Sweet 16: The Movie is a television film based on the series My Super Sweet 16. It stars teen popstars Aly & AJ, R&B & Soul star Paula DeAnda and features performances by Hellogoodbye and Pretty Ricky. The film stars Amanda Michalka and Regine Nehy. The film premiered on MTV on July 8, 2007, and the DVD was released on July 10, 2007, the same date that Aly & AJ's third studio album Insomniatic was released as well as DeAnda's Easy (Paula DeAnda song).

Plot
The film centers on best friends Sara (Amanda Michalka) and Jacquie (Regine Nehy). They share everything, including the same birthday, which they always celebrate together. Sara and Jacquie start making plans for a huge "Sweet 16" party for the both of them, all with proceeds going to a charity called "Hollywood Heart". However, when Jacquie transfers to the school Sara goes to, a rich girl called Taylor makes friends with Jacquie (because Taylor never had a sweet sixteen) and then proceeds to change Jacquie to be more like herself in order to destroy Sara and Jacquie's relationship. Jacquie unwittingly falls into her plan. Sara tries to deal with Jacquie's personality change until Jacquie starts insisting to make Taylor a party planner, something that Sara hates. This leads to many more arguments until finally, the two split the party and compete with each other to have the biggest party, all while insulting each other. At the same time, Alicia (Paula DeAnda) is making her way through the movie as an unexpected romance occurs between Shannon, Taylor's brother, and Sara.

Cast
Amanda "AJ" Michalka: Sara Connors
Regine Nehy: Jacquie Anderson
Alyson "Aly" Michalka: Taylor Tiara/Plimpton
Brendan Miller: Shannon Plimpton
Ethan Phillips: Craig
Roddy Piper: Mitch Connors
Sicily Sewell: Chloe Spears
Nikki Flores: Zoey Cortez
Shanica Knowles: Sierra
Paula DeAnda: Alicia
Cassie Steele: Sophie Barnetz
Brandon T. Jackson: Brian
Rocco Vienhage: Coleman Palm
Renee Olstead: Sky Storm
Debra Wilson: Edan Day
Tina Knowles: herself
Katherine J: Hannah
J Xavier: Randy
Sarya Jackson: young Jacquie Anderson

Full release dates
United States: July 8, 2007, on MTV and July 29, 2007, on The N
United States: July 10, 2007, on DVD
New Zealand: October 13, 2007, on MTV
Australia: October 13, 2007, on MTV
Mexico: October 12, 2007, on MTV
Paraguay: November 24, 2007, on MTV
The Netherlands: December 26, 2007, on MTV

See also
My Super Sweet 16
 My Super Psycho Sweet 16

References

External links
 
 
 My Super Sweet 16 Online Social Network

2007 films
2007 comedy films
2007 television films
2000s English-language films
2000s teen comedy films
American teen comedy films
American comedy television films
Films about birthdays
Films based on television series
Films directed by Neema Barnette
MTV original films
Paramount Pictures direct-to-video films
2000s American films